Southern Downs is an electoral district of the Legislative Assembly in the Australian state of Queensland. It was created in 2001 as a replacement for Warwick.

The district takes in the southern parts of the Darling Downs region along the New South Wales border. It includes the major towns of Warwick, Stanthorpe , and Goondiwindi and extends westward almost to St George. It includes several smaller communities such as:
 Allora
 Cecil Plains
 Inglewood
 Killarney
 Leyburn
 Millmerran
 Texas
 Wallangarra
 Yelarbon

Darling Downs has traditionally been a conservative area, and Southern Downs is no exception. It has been a comfortably safe seat for the Liberal National Party and its predecessor, the National Party for its entire existence. Predecessor seat Warwick had been in the hands of a non-Labor party since 1947.

The seat's first member, Lawrence Springborg, transferred from Warwick in 2001. He served as the last leader of the Queensland branch of the National Party for a few months in 2008, having previously served in that post from 2003 to 2006. He served as the first leader of the LNP from 2008 to 009, and served as leader again from 2015 to 2016. He also served as a minister in the Newman government.

Members for Southern Downs

Election results

References

External links
 

Darling Downs
Southern Downs